Dmitry Nikolaevich Pryanishnikov  (6 November 1865 — 30 April 1948) was an agrochemist, biochemist and plant physiologist, founder of the Soviet scientific school in agronomic chemistry. Hero of Socialist Labor (1945).

Academician of the Academy of Sciences of the USSR (1929) and the Academy of Agricultural Sciences (1936), corresponding member of the French Academy of Sciences, founder and director of the Scientific Institute for Fertilizers chemicalization of the national economy.

Notable for decency and civil courage. For example, for several years he tried to rescue a geneticist Nikolai Vavilov from prison, for this he sought a personal reception from Beria and his deputy Kobulov, wrote several letters to  Stalin, and also presented Vavilov who was imprisoned award and put forward his candidacy for election to the Supreme Soviet of the USSR.

References

External links
 Dmitry Pryanishnikov on RAS
 Dmitry Pryanishnikov on IS ARAS

1865 births
1948 deaths
People from Buryatia
People from Transbaikal Oblast
Agricultural chemists
Biochemists from the Russian Empire
Soviet biochemists
Plant physiologists
Soviet botanists
19th-century botanists from the Russian Empire
Imperial Moscow University alumni
Full Members of the USSR Academy of Sciences
Academicians of the VASKhNIL
Corresponding members of the Saint Petersburg Academy of Sciences
Corresponding Members of the Russian Academy of Sciences (1917–1925)
Members of the French Academy of Sciences
Stalin Prize winners
Heroes of Socialist Labour
Recipients of the Order of Lenin
Lenin Prize winners
Deaths from pneumonia in the Soviet Union
Burials at Vagankovo Cemetery
Soviet agronomists